'EX' All Time Favourites  is a Cantopop/Mandopop tribute album by Hong Kong solo artist Shirley Kwan, released in 1995. It was released in Hong Kong, Taiwan, China and  Japan, and later remastered in 1997.

Track listings

Hong Kong release

Taiwan release
In the Taiwan version of EX, "Forget Him" and "This Is Love" were replaced with newly arranged Mandarin versions of "It's a Pity" (Track 1) and "Can't Let Go" (Track 6).

Other releases
Besides the Hong Kong and Taiwan releases, there are at least four other versions of 'EX'. These include:

 1995: China version, called "What a Pity" (可惜), essentially a hybrid of the Hong Kong & Taiwan versions
 1995 Jul: Japanese version
 1997 Mar: PolyGram 88 Superb Sound Quality Series Denon Mastersonic Digital Remastering CD
 2003 Dec: Hybrid Stereo SACD

References 

Shirley Kwan albums
1995 albums